Jeonui station is a railway station in Jeonui-myeon, Sejong City, South Korea.

Station 
This station is on the Gyeongbu Line with 2 platforms for 4 tracks. Station and platforms are connected with level crossing.

There are 14 Mugunghwa-ho trains that stop at the station.

References 

Railway stations in Sejong